Abraham Lincoln "Ham" Wade (December 20, 1879 – July 21, 1968) was a Major League Baseball player. Wade played in one game in the 1907 season with the New York Giants. He was hit by a pitch in his only plate appearance, giving him a perfect OBP of 1.000, and made two putouts as an outfielder, giving him a perfect fielding percentage of 1.000.  Four other players have been hit by a pitch in their only Major League plate appearance: Charlie Faust in 1911, Harvey Grubb in 1912, Cy Malis in 1934, and Fred Van Dusen in 1955.

Wade was born in Spring City, Pennsylvania, and died in Riverside, New Jersey.

External links

New York Giants (NL) players
Norwich Reds players
New Haven Blues players
Meriden Silverites players
1879 births
1968 deaths
Baseball players from Pennsylvania